Gap junction alpha-5 protein (GJA5), also known as connexin 40 (Cx40) — is a protein that in humans is encoded by the GJA5 gene.

Function 

This gene is a member of the connexin gene family. The encoded protein is a component of gap junctions, which are composed of arrays of intercellular channels that provide a route for the diffusion of low molecular weight materials from cell to cell. Mutations in this gene may be associated with atrial fibrillation. Alternatively spliced transcript variants encoding the same isoform have been described.

GJA5 has been identified as the gene that is responsible for the phenotypes observed with congenital heart diseases on the 1q21.1 location. In case of a duplication of GJA5 tetralogy of Fallot is more common. In case of a deletion other congenital heart diseases than tetralogy of Fallot are more common.

Related gene problems
1q21.1 deletion syndrome
1q21.1 duplication syndrome

See also
 Connexin
 Gap junction

References

Further reading

Connexins